The Anti-Defamation League is an international Jewish organization based in the US.

Anti-Defamation League may also refer to:

 American Italian Anti-Defamation League
 National Mexican-American Anti-Defamation Committee